Transnormal Skiperoo is a 2007 album by Jim White. It was produced by Joe Pernice and Michael Deming, recorded with the band Olabelle and also features tracks with Tucker Martine and Laura Veirs, local Georgia legend Don Chambers and Goat, bluegrass duo Jeff & Vida and percussionist Mauro Refosco.

In a 2007 interview White said the album title was a term he had invented to describe "a strange new feeling I've been experiencing after years of feeling lost and alone and cursed."

He explained: "Now, when everything around me begins to shine, when I find myself dancing around in my back yard for no particular reason other than it feels good to be alive, when I get this deep sense of gratitude that I don't need drugs or God or doomed romance to fuel myself through the gauntlet of a normal day, I call that feeling 'Transnormal Skiperoo'."

White said the album marked a change of mood, both personally and musically: "I could keep writing songs about being sad and miserable, that’s my stock in trade, but it’s not a true reflection of how I am now. I vividly recall being sad and lost, but now I feel a true sense of purpose. I have a one year old daughter, a wife I love and a place in the world as a musician.

"This record is, in part, a sigh of relief I'm not stuck in the quagmire anymore, There’s still some old songs, like 'Jailbird', that I've only just got around to releasing, but there's lots of different kinds of songs too. I have a feeling people like me better sad, but I hope they are in my corner now I can feel and try to express happiness and a sense of fulfillment.

"It’s still new for me, I've built up a vocabulary over 45 years of sadness and maybe five years of joy, I'm still finding my way. On my last album I tried to write a song of love about my daughter but it wound up being about junkies and sleaze. It's taken me a while to meet the challenge, I hope I've done it with songs like 'Diamonds to Coal'."

Track listing
(all tracks by Jim White)

 "A Town Called Amen" – 3:42
 "Blindly We Go" – 2:59
 "Jailbird" – 5:55
 "Crash Into the Sun" – 4:22
 "Fruit of the Vine" – 7:50
 "Take Me Away" – 4:27
 "Turquoise House" – 3:18
 "Diamonds to Coal" – 4:36
 "Counting Numbers in the Air" – 5:20
 "Plywood Superman" – 5:36
 "Pieces of Heaven" – 3:07
 "It's Been a Long Long Day" – 3:51

Personnel

 Jim White – vocals, guitars, harmonica, banjo, Hammond M3, keyboard, mini-vibes
 Byron Isaacs – bass, dobro, stand-up bass, vocals
 Tony Leone – drums, vocals
 Glenn Patscha – keyboards, vocals
 Fiona McBain – vocals
 Mauro Refosco – percussion
 Patrick Hargon – lead guitar
 Tucker Martine – drums, vocals
 Steve Moore – keys, vocals, horns
 Karl Blau – bass, horns, vocals
 Laura Veirs – vocals ("Crash Into the Sun")
 Clyde Petersen – vocals
 Don Chambers – banjo, vocal
 Matt "Pistol" Stoessel – slide guitar, pedal steel
 Lisa Hargon – bass, drums, vocals
 Brandon McDearis –  drums
 Vida Wakeman – vocals
 Jeff Burke – banjo, mandolin, vocals
 Michael Deming – recorder, washboard
 Joe Pernice – vocals ("Take Me Away")
 Levon Henry – tenor sax
 Robin Pratt – vocals
 Patrick Warren – keyboards, marxophone
 Chris Riser –  stand-up bass
 Amanda Kapousouz – violin

Appearances in other media
 Crash Into the Sun was played during a scene in Life during the episode Re-entry. (Series 2 Episode 13).

References

Jim White (musician) albums
2007 albums
Luaka Bop albums
Albums produced by Tucker Martine